Rajendra Nagar Terminal, (Station code: RJPB),  is a railway station serving the capital city of Patna in the Indian state of Bihar. It is located in Rajendra Nagar in Patna and is in the Danapur railway division of the East Central Railway zone of the Indian Railways. Some famous trains departs from here Rajendranagar–Banka Intercity Superfast Express, Patna Tejas, Sampoorna Kranti Express, etc.

History

It was developed as an alternative railway station as part of measures to decongest Patna Junction railway station. Many trains such as New Delhi–Rajendra Nagar Rajendra Nagar Patna Rajdhani Express, Indore–Patna Express, Indore–Rajendra Nagar via Faizabad Express, Sampoorna Kranti Express, South Bihar Express, etc. originate from here.

It was inaugurated on 31 March 2003 as a full-fledged station. Its main entrance is opposite the College of Commerce, Patna.

Lalu Prasad Yadav, then Union Railway Minister, also flagged off the first stainless steel fully covered wagons (BCNHL) train from Rajendra Nagar Terminal. He also unveiled a statue of Dr Rajendra Prasad at Rajendra Nagar Terminal after whom this station has been named.

References

External links

Railway stations in Patna
Danapur railway division
Railway stations opened in 2003
Memorials to Rajendra Prasad
2003 establishments in Bihar